Metamesia dilucida is a species of moth of the family Tortricidae. It is found on Madagascar.

References

	

Moths described in 1960
Archipini